Mukh Kampul is a district (srok) of Kandal Province, Cambodia. The district is subdivided into 9 communes (khum) such as Bak Khaeng, Kaoh Dach, Preaek Anhchanh, Preaek Dambang, Roka Kaong Muoy, Roka Kaong Pir, Ruessei Chrouy, Sambuor Meas, Svay Ampear and 47 villages (phum).

References

External links
Kandal at Royal Government of Cambodia website
Kandal at Ministry of Commerce website

Districts of Kandal province